The 2018 Reno 1868 FC season is the club's second season of existence, their second in the second tier of American soccer and their second in the United Soccer League.

Background

Transfers

Transfers in

Transfers out 

 Chris Wehan – to SJ Earthquakes
 Matt LaGrassa – to Nashville SC
 Matheus Silva – end of loan, transferred to Swope Park Rangers
 Luis Felipe Fernandes  – to SJ Earthquakes
 Mackenzie Pridham – released
 Dane Kelly – to DC United

Loan in 
 Chris Wehan from SJ Earthquakes
 Luis Felipe Fernandes  – from SJ Earthquakes

Squad

Non-competitive

Competitive

USL

Standings

Results 

All times in Pacific Time

Postseason

U.S. Open Cup

Statistics

Appearances
Players with no appearances not included in the list.

Goalscorers
Includes all competitive matches.

Clean sheets 
Includes all competitive matches.
Correct as of matches played on May 26, 2018

Disciplinary record

Awards

See also 
 2018 San Jose Earthquakes season

References 

Reno 1868 FC
Reno 1868 FC
Reno 1868 FC seasons
Reno 1868 FC